Trifolium macraei is a species of clover known by the common names Chilean clover, double-head clover, and MacRae's clover. It has a disjunct distribution, occurring on the coastline of Oregon and California in the United States, as well as in South America. It grows in coastal habitat, such as sand dunes, and disturbed areas. It is an annual herb taking a decumbent or erect form. The leaves are made up of oval leaflets 1 to 2 centimeters in length. The inflorescence is usually made up of two oval or rounded heads of flowers each measuring up to 1.5 centimeters wide. Each flower has a calyx of sepals which taper into densely hairy bristles. The flower corolla is purple or bicolored with white or pink.

References

External links
Calflora Database: Trifolium macraei (Macrae's clover, Chilean clover)
Jepson Manual eFlora (TJM2) treatment of Trifolium macraei

UC CalPhotos gallery: Trifolium macraei

macraei
Flora of California
Flora of Chile
Flora of Oregon
Natural history of the California chaparral and woodlands
Natural history of the California Coast Ranges
Natural history of the Channel Islands of California
Natural history of the San Francisco Bay Area
Flora without expected TNC conservation status